Giuliano Calore (born 1938) is an Italian racing cyclist, world champion of extreme cycling, holder of 13 records and winner of 98 medals. From 1981 to 2011, he established 13 records in the Guinness Book of World Records.

Filmography
48 Tornanti di Notte (2016)

References

External links

 Official site

1938 births
Italian male cyclists
Sportspeople from Padua
Living people
Cyclists from the Province of Padua